You and Me Are Three (Spanish: Tú y yo somos tres) is a 1962 Argentine-Spanish comedy film directed by Rafael Gil. It is about a woman who falls in love by correspondence with a man who turns out to have a conjoined twin. It is based on a play by Enrique Jardiel Poncela.

Cast

References

External links

Argentine comedy films
1962 comedy films
Spanish comedy films
Films directed by Rafael Gil
Fictional conjoined twins
1960s Spanish-language films
1960s Argentine films